The Iowa State Cyclones are the intercollegiate athletic teams that represent Iowa State University, located in Ames. The university is a member of the Big 12 Conference and competes in NCAA Division I, fielding 16 varsity teams (6 men's and 10 women's teams) in 12 sports.

The "Cyclones" name dates back to 1895. That year, Iowa suffered an unusually high number of devastating cyclones (as tornadoes were called at the time). In September, the football team from what was then Iowa Agricultural College traveled to Northwestern University and defeated that team by a score of 45–0. The next day, the Chicago Tribunes headline read "Struck by a Cyclone: It Comes from Iowa and Devastates Evanston Town." The article began, "Northwestern might as well have tried to play football with an Iowa cyclone as with the Iowa team it met yesterday." The nickname stuck.

Sports sponsored

Iowa State's athletic director is Jamie Pollard. Since his arrival in 2005, Pollard has replaced head coaches in football, wrestling, men's basketball, gymnastics, soccer, cross country/track & field, women's golf, tennis, and softball. Additionally, he has initiated major renovations to Hilton Coliseum and Jack Trice Stadium, and constructed a basketball practice facility.

Men's sports

Men's basketball

The Iowa State Cyclones men's basketball team competes in the Big 12 Conference of NCAA Division I athletics.  T. J. Otzelberger is the current ISU men's basketball head coach. Prior to the 2017–18 season, Iowa State has a 1339–1293 all-time record, and has been to the NCAA Tournament nineteen times including five Sweet 16 appearances, an Elite 8 appearance, and a Final Four appearance. ISU has also won six regular conference titles and six conference tournament titles. Iowa State men's basketball team plays in Hilton Coliseum, part of the Iowa State Center on the south-east side of Iowa State University, and is known as one of the best venues in all of college basketball.

{| class="wikitable collapsible collapsed"
|-
! colspan=0 | Yearly Records
|-
|

Cross country

The Iowa State men's cross country team competes in the Big 12 Conference of NCAA Division I athletics.  Jeremy Sudbury is the current ISU men's cross country head coach.

They have 28 conference titles since they first formed a men's cross country team in 1909.  Their 25 Big Eight Conference championships were the most in the conference's 84-year history.  They have competed in the NCAA tournament as a team 22 times as well as winning the tournament in 1989 and 1994 and finishing as runner up in 1990, 1991, and 2021.

The cross country team hosts their home meets at the state-of-the-art cross country course south of Iowa State's campus.

Football

Iowa State plays NCAA Division I FBS football in the Big 12 Conference. Iowa State football team is led by head coach Matt Campbell. ISU started playing football in 1892, however, it did not become an official sport until 1894. The Cyclones have a 512–624–46 all-time record and are 3–7 in post season play.

The Cyclones play home games in Jack Trice Stadium. The stadium is named after Jack Trice, a football player who incurred a fatal injury while playing for the Cyclones against Minnesota in 1923. In 1975, the stadium's playing field was named in honor of Trice, Iowa State's first African American athlete and the school's first athlete to die of injuries sustained during a Cyclone athletic competition. Until 1997, the facility itself was known as Cyclone Stadium. Because of persistent requests by the students, the facility was renamed Jack Trice Stadium, making it the only Division I FBS stadium named for an African American individual.

Before the 2015 football season the most recent renovations to Jack Trice Stadium were completed.  Among others upgrades, an addition to the stadium bowling in the south end-zone named the Sukup End Zone was built. This added an addition 3,000 seats increasing total stadium capacity to 61,500.

Golf

The Iowa State men's golf team competes in the Big 12 Conference of NCAA Division I athletics.  Andrew Tank is the current ISU men's golf head coach.

They have three conference titles since they first formed a men's golf team in 1935.  They have competed in the NCAA tournament as a team 22 times

The team practices at the Golf Performance Center that opened in 2013.

Track & field

The Iowa State men's track & field team competes in the Big 12 Conference of NCAA Division I athletics.  Martin Smith is in his 4th year as ISU's Director of Men's and Women's Track and Cross Country.

They have 13 conference titles since they first formed a men's track & field team in 1908.  They have made 52 appearances at the indoor and outdoor NCAA championships including nine indoor and 13 outdoor individual national titles.

The track & field team hosts their home meets at the Lied Recreation Center for indoor meets and the Cyclone Sports Complex for outdoor meets.

Wrestling

The Iowa State wrestling team competes in the Big 12 Conference of NCAA Division I athletics.  Kevin Dresser is the current ISU wrestling head coach.

They have 17  conference titles since they first formed a wrestling team in 1916.  They have won the third most NCAA wrestling champions in NCAA history with eight as well as 66 individual national titles.  Iowa State has had 15 wrestlers who have participated in the Olympics resulting in six gold and three bronze medals.

The wrestling team hosts their home meets at Hilton Coliseum.  The team practices at Lied Recreation Center.

{| class="wikitable collapsible collapsed"
|-
! colspan=0 | Yearly Wrestling Records
|-
| valign=top |

| valign=top |

| valign=top |

| valign=top |

| valign=top |

Women's sports

Basketball

The Iowa State women's basketball team competes in the Big 12 Conference of NCAA Division I athletics.  Bill Fennelly is in his 22nd season as ISU's head women's basketball coach. Coach Fennelly's record is 465–236 and ISU's all-time record is 677–562.

They have earned one regular season conference title and two conference tournament titles since they first formed a women's basketball team in 1973.  They have competed in the NCAA tournament 17 times including five trips to the Sweet Sixteen and two trips to the Elite Eight.

The women's basketball team plays their home games in Hilton Coliseum.  The team practices at the Sukup Basketball Complex. Attendance at ISU women's games have ranked in the top ten for eighteen consecutive years.

Cross country

The Iowa State women's cross country team competes in the Big 12 Conference of NCAA Division I athletics.  Andrea Grove-McDonough is in her 4th ISU's head women's cross country coach.

They have 12 conference team titles and nine individual titles since they first formed a men's cross country team in 1973.  Their 8 Big Eight Conference championships were the most in the conference's 20-year history.  They have five AIAW national championships as well as finishing the NCAA championship twice as runner-up.  They have had one NCAA individual championship, Betsy Saina, who also holds the NCAA 6,000 meter record.

The cross country team hosts their home meets at the state-of-the-art cross country course south of Iowa State's campus.

Golf

The Iowa State women's golf team competes in the Big 12 Conference of NCAA Division I athletics.  Christie Martens is in her 17th season as ISU's head women's golf coach.

They have earned one conference championship as a team and one individual conference championship since they first formed a women's golf team in 1972.  They have competed in the NCAA regional tournament 14 times as well as the championship four times.

The team practices at the Golf Performance Center that opened in 2013.

Gymnastics

The Iowa State women's gymnastics team competes in the Big 12 Conference of NCAA Division I athletics.  Jay Ronayne is in his 10th season as ISU's head women's gymnastics coach.  Coach Ronayne's record is 68–120–5 and ISU's all-time record is 518–594–7.

They have four conference championships as well as 30 individual conference championships since they first formed a women's gymnastics team in 1977.  They have competed in the NCAA tournament as a team eight times including one appearance in the Super Six in 2006 in addition to having 14 individual qualifiers.

The gymnastics team hosts their home meets at Hilton Coliseum.  The team practices at the Amy and Dennis Pyle Family Gymnastics Facility.

Soccer

The Iowa State women's soccer team competes in the Big 12 Conference of NCAA Division I athletics.  Tony Minatta is in his 5th season as ISU's head women's soccer coach.  ISU's all-time record is 159–200–30.

They have yet to earn a conference title but have appeared in the conference championship nine times since they first formed a women's soccer team in 1995.  They have made one appearance in the NCAA tournament.

The soccer team plays their home games at the Cyclone Sports Complex that opened in 2012.

Softball

The Iowa State softball team competes in the Big 12 Conference of NCAA Division I athletics.  Jamie Pinkerton is in his 1st season as ISU's head softball coach. ISU's all-time record is 921-1032-6.

They have earned two conference championships since they first formed a softball team in 1974.  The team has finished as runner-up in two Women's College World Series, in 1971 and 1973.  In addition to their collegiate honors the Cyclones have produced two Olympians in Erin Woods and Kristen Karanzias.

The softball team plays their home games at the Cyclone Sports Complex that opened in 2012.  The team practices at the Bergstrom Indoor Practice Facility.

Swimming & diving

The Iowa State swimming & diving team competes in the Big 12 Conference of NCAA Division I athletics.  Duane Sorenson is in his 19th season as ISU's head women's swimming & and diving coach.  Coach Sorenson's record is 103–84–1 and ISU's all-time record is 202–179–1.

They have earned one conference title as a team and 40 individual conference championships since they first formed a women's swimming & diving team in 1970.  They have had 30 AIAW qualifiers and 44 NCAA qualifiers.

The swimming & diving team hosts their home meets at Beyer Pool on Iowa State's campus.

Tennis

The Iowa State women's tennis team competes in the Big 12 Conference of NCAA Division I athletics.  Armando Espinosa is in his 9th season as ISU's head women's tennis coach.

The women's tennis team utilize the Forker Tennis Courts for outdoor meets and practice when weather allows.  The team hosts indoor meets and practice at the Bruce McKee Indoor Tennis Complex.

Track & field

The Iowa State women's track & field team competes in the Big 12 Conference of NCAA Division I athletics.  Martin Smith is in his 4th year as ISU's Director of Men's and Women's Track and Cross Country.

They have nine conference titles since they first formed a women's track & field team in 1974.  They have made 24 appearances at the indoor and outdoor NCAA championships including eight indoor and 14 outdoor individual national titles.

The track & field team hosts their home meets at the Lied Recreation Center for indoor meets and the Cyclone Sports Complex for outdoor meets.

Volleyball

The Iowa State women's volleyball team competes in the Big 12 Conference of NCAA Division I athletics.  Christy Johnson-Lynch is in her 12th season as ISU's head women's volleyball coach.  Coach Johnson-Lynch has a record of 246–123 and ISU's all-time record is 787–719–10.

They have competed in the NCAA tournament 12 times since they first formed a women's volleyball team in 1973, including three appearances in the Sweet 16 and two in the Elite 8.

The volleyball team hosts their home matches at Hilton Coliseum on Iowa State's campus.

Former varsity sports

Baseball

Iowa State fielded baseball as an official sports team from 1892 until the conclusion of the 2000–2001 season. Iowa State discontinued baseball due to budget constraints, but it remains as a club sport.  Iowa State had a 1,346–1,412–17 all-time record including a 7–6 NCAA tournament record and two appearances in the College World Series. Following the discontinuation of baseball, Iowa State is now the only Big 12 school and one of only four Power 5 schools that do not sponsor the sport, the other three being Colorado, Syracuse, and Wisconsin.

Other sports

Iowa State has dropped the following sports:

 Men's tennis (1994)
 Men's gymnastics (1994)
 Men's swimming (2001)

Iowa State dropped men's tennis and men's gymnastics in 1994 and added women's soccer in 1995, ahead of a 1998 deadline for compliance with Title IX; these changes resulted in 6 men's sports and 10 women's sports.

Championships

National team championships

Conference championships

Club sports

ISU has a variety of club sports for both men and women.  Some clubs just compete on the intramural level on ISU's campus while other compete for championships on the national level.

Soccer

The Iowa State men's soccer club competes in Region 5 of NIRSA and has competed in the Championship Division of the NIRSA National Soccer Tournament 2 of the last 4 years. The Cyclones regularly schedule games with colleges throughout Iowa and surrounding states. While the club has a history of producing highly successful goalkeepers, undoubtedly their biggest strength has been their defensive unit. The club would compete with in-state rivals, the Iowa Hawkeyes, but their club has a history of not accepting game invites.

Baseball

ISU baseball was cut by the school's athletic department in 2000; but it continues, as a club sport, to provide students with the opportunity to attend ISU and play competitive baseball.  The team is a member of the National Club Baseball Association and competes in the North Division of the Mid-America Conference.

They play their home games at Cap Timm Field on Iowa State's campus.

Crew

Iowa State has both of men's and women's club crew team.  They have competed since first forming in 2002.

Equestrian

Iowa State has an equestrian club team that competes in the Intercollegiate Horse Show Association with two different teams, Hunt (English) and Stock (western).

They are coached by Rebecca Ness.

Golf

The Iowa State Golf Club first formed in 2009 and has competed in the National Collegiate Golf Club Association since 2013.  They have reached the NCCGA National Championship three times since joining the association (Spring 2015, Fall 2015, and Spring 2016), and the NCCGA National Invitational Tournament once (Spring 2018).

The club hosts home meets and practice at Veenker Memorial Golf Course on Iowa State's campus.

Ice Hockey

Iowa State Men's Hockey is technically a club sport but operates like a non-scholarship sport.  ISU has played in the Division I Central States Collegiate Hockey League conference since 1979, which is part of the American Collegiate Hockey Association.  They have been runner-up five times and won one ACHA national championship in 1992.

The Iowa State women's hockey team competes in Division II of the ACHA and won the national championship in 2014.

Both team host their home meets and practice at Ames/ISU Ice Arena

Lacrosse

Iowa State's club lacrosse team competes in Division I of the Upper Midwest Lacrosse League.

They host their home games and practice at Lied Recreation Facility on Iowa State's campus.

Martial Arts

Iowa State has had various martial arts clubs since 1963.  When Master Yong Chin Pak joined the Iowa State faculty in 1973 the clubs took a massive step forward.  They existed separately  until 2011 when they were all combined to form the Cyclone Martial Arts Club.

Rodeo

ISU Rodeo is a member of the National Intercollegiate Rodeo Association (NIRA) and hosts the Cyclone Stampede Rodeo which is one of the oldest collegiate rodeo athletic events in the US.

Rugby

The Iowa State Rugby Club plays college rugby in Division IAA in the Heart of America conference against many of Iowa State's traditional athletic rivals such as Iowa, Missouri, and Kansas State.

The team is coached by Anthony “Ant” Frein, who led them to their first appearance in the Collegiate Rugby Championship in 2021.

Rivalries/Trophy games

Cy-Hawk Series

Started in 2004, the annual Hy-Vee Cy-Hawk Series gives points to the Hawkeyes and Cyclones based on wins in 11 sports and academic achievement. Each team is awarded 2 points for a win (except football which gets 3 points), 1 point for a tie, and 2 points for having athletes average GPA better than national average. At the end of the year the team with the most points wins the series for that year.  The series is currently tied with 7 wins for each school.

Men's golf
Volleyball
Women's soccer
Football
Men's cross country
Women's cross country
Wrestling
Men's basketball
Women's basketball
Women's swimming & diving
Women's gymnastics
Softball

The football specific Cy-Hawk Trophy was introduced in 1977 when the two teams met for the first time since 1934. The trophy is awarded to the victor of the annual football game. The trophy features a football player, with the Cyclone's and Hawkeye's logos.

Farmageddon

The teams first met in football in 1917, when both schools were members of the Big Eight Conference. The match-up continued as an annual conference game through the schools' shift into the Big 12 Conference. The series has been dominated by long winning streaks for both teams, with each team's longest winning streak at 10 games. Kansas State is 22–4 since 1989. Iowa State leads the series 50–48–4 all-time.

Telephone Trophy (dormant)

Missouri and Iowa State first met in football in 1896 and the regional rivalry was born. Before the 1959 match-up between the two schools, which took place in Ames, Iowa, field testing showed that the telephones the two schools used to communicate with their coaches in the coaches box were wired so that either school could hear what was happening on the other sideline. The problem was fixed before the game, but neither of the two coaches knew that. Northwestern Bell Telephone Company of Ames then decided to have a trophy made to commemorate the incident, and thus the Telephone Trophy was born. Missouri leads the rivalry 61–34–9 all-time. When Missouri left the Big 12 for the SEC the rivalry was essentially ended.

Traditions

Hall of Fame

The Iowa State Cyclones Hall of Fame is a hall of fame that recognizes former student-athletes that achieved great success during their time at Iowa State University over the past 120 years.

The Hall was first created in 1997.  Since the program's inception in 1997, there have been 154 individuals inducted.

Mascot

Iowa State uses a cardinal, Cy, as its mascot instead of an actual tornado or Cyclone.  Prior to the football match up against the University of Colorado on November 12, 2005, a tornado touched down in Ames, Iowa and forced fans to either stand out in the parking lot and watch the storm or flee to shelter in Hilton Coliseum.  It created such an atmosphere that Iowa State was able to win over the favored Buffaloes 30–16.  When asked about the event, Colorado coach Gary Barnett said, "I thought we had a pretty good mascot. But when we showed up at Iowa State and they had a real tornado, that's the real deal."

Colors

Originally silver, yellow, and black, the school colors were changed to cardinal and gold in 1899 to make dyeing sweaters easier.  A council was formed in October 1899 with the purpose of finding new colors that would be suitable for sweaters.  The council reported in favor of cardinal sweaters with gold lettering. According to cyclones.com (Iowa State Athletics official website), the Iowa State teams were originally known as the "Cardinals", though there is no other evidence to support it, it is assumed that the cardinal color was derived from the original team name.

 Cardinal
 Gold

Cheers

ISU Fights is the official fight song for Iowa State University:

O we will fight, fight, fight for Iowa State, 
And may her colors ever fly. 
Yes, we will fight with might for Iowa State, 
With a will to do or die, 
Rah! Rah! Rah! 
Loyal sons forever true, 
And we will fight the battle through. 
And when we hit that line we'll hit it hard every yard for I. S. U!

Facilities

Hilton Coliseum

James H. Hilton Coliseum is a 14,384-seat multi-purpose arena. The arena, which is part of the Iowa State Center, opened in 1971. It is home to the Iowa State men's basketball, women's basketball, wrestling, gymnastics, and volleyball teams. The building was specifically built to hold in sound with a solid concrete structure, steel doors, and a crowd that sits just a few feet from the court. During big games, players from opposing teams, as well as Iowa State, have even said that the floor has shaken due to the loudness of the crowd.

Sukup Basketball Complex

The $8 million,  facility, includes two separate 10,000 square- foot gymnasiums for both men's and women's basketball programs, as well as separate lounges and locker rooms, a theater room, a medical treatment area, and coaches' offices and conference rooms.

Jack Trice Stadium

Jack Trice Stadium (formerly Cyclone Stadium) is a 61,500-seat stadium.  The arena opened on September 20, 1975, with a win against Air Force).  It is home to the Iowa State Cyclones football team.  The current record for single-game attendance, 61,500, was set on September 5, 2015, when the Cyclones defeated the Northern Iowa 31–7.  In 1997, the stadium was named in honor of Jack Trice, ISU's first African American athlete and the school's first athletics-related fatality.  The stadium is the only one in Division I-A named for an African American individual.

Bergstrom Indoor Facility

The Steve and Debbie Bergstrom Indoor Training Facility opened in March 2004.  It is a  multi-purpose, indoor practice facility.  Inside the facility is a full-sized astroturf football field.  Though typically associated with football, it is also used for practice by the softball and soccer teams, as well as community events.  The building sits just northwest of Jack Trice Stadium and is part of the Johnny Majors Practice Complex.  The facility cost $9.6 million to build and was funded by private gifts to the athletic department and ISU Foundation.

On October 26, 2012, Iowa State dedicated a 20.6 million, 156,000 square-foot, expansion of the football facility with an additional lead gift from the Bergstrom family. This included replacing the playing surface of the indoor facility, a state-of-the-art strength and conditional facility, a coaches office complex, positional meeting rooms, an auditorium, and spacious locker rooms.  This completed the goal for Iowa State to have an stand alone football-only training facility.

Cyclone Sports Complex

The $13 million Cyclone Sports Complex, the home of Iowa State track and field, soccer and softball opened in the fall of 2012.  Some of the state-of-the-art facility's amenities are home and away locker rooms, officials' locker rooms, team meeting rooms, athletic training room, and a seating capacity of 1,500.

Veenker Memorial Golf Course

The 6,543-yard, par-72, George Veenker Memorial Golf Course is located just two blocks north of the Iowa State campus.  The 18-hole course was constructed in 1938 from the design of world-renowned golf course architect, Perry Maxwell.  The course hosted the conference championships in 1982 and 1989, two regional AIAW championships, and hosts the annual Iowa Masters Championship.  It also hosted the 1949 NCAA national championship.

Beyer Hall

Beyer Hall is home to Iowa State's women's swimming and diving team and women's gymnastics team.  The swimming and diving team practices and holds competition in the Beyer Pool, a six lane, T-shaped, 25-yard competitive pool with an attached diving well, and seating for approximately 800 spectators.  The Beyer Pool has hosted the 1963 and 1971 NCAA meets, as well as numerous conference championships.  Though the gymnastics team competes in Hilton Coliseum, they practice across the hall from Beyer Pool in the Amy and Dennis Pyle Family Gymnastics Facility. Renovated in 2002, the practice facility is used by collegiate and elementary athletes alike.

McKee Tennis Complex

The Bruce McKee Indoor Tennis Complex opened in 2016 as a tennis specific training and competition facility.  McKee, a longtime athletics supporter and 1956 graduate of Iowa State, provided a $500,000 lead gift for the $2 million complex.

Cross Country Course

The $250,000, Iowa State Cross Country Course was dedicated in 1995 and was host of the NCAA Division I Cross Country Championships that fall, and again in 2000.   The course runs through the Iowa State Arboretum and was the first course in the nation designed exclusively for competitive cross country racing.

Hixson-Lied Student Success Center

The 10 million dollar, Hixson-Lied Student Success Center, was designed for improving academic achievement campus wide, with the second floor devoted specifically to student athletes.  The facility was built using private contributions. Since its completion in 2006, Iowa State student athletes have dramatically improved in the class room and now boost a higher average GPA (Grade point average) than the rest of the student body.

Jacobson Athletic Building

Built in 1995 and located off the north end zone of Jack Trice Stadium, The Jacobson Athletic Building formerly housed the football offices, locker rooms, meeting rooms, strength and conditioning room, and sports medicine room. The space was renovated in 2008 and 2009 to use the vacated space by the football team. It now is home to men's and women's golf, tennis, swimming, wrestling, cross country and track and field. This allows the entire athletic department staff to be under one roof with the exception of men's and women's basketball and volleyball.

Lied Recreation Center

The Lied Recreation Center is a multi-purpose building housing the soccer team lockers, practice facility for wrestling, and a 300-meter track for indoor competition.  The $13 million center, was host of the 1998, 2000, and 2007 indoor track and field Big 12 Championships.  The new mondo track has eight 42-inch lanes, making it the largest and one of the fastest indoor surfaces in the world. There is portable seating for 2,000 spectators and also includes two long jump/triple jump pits and a pole vault runway.  The facility also includes showers, saunas, steam rooms, and a sports medicine center.

ISU Soccer Complex

Built in 1995 when women's soccer was added as an official sport at Iowa State, the ISU Soccer Complex sits just east of the Lied Recreation Athletics Center.  It was home to the women's soccer team until the Cyclone Sports Complex opened in 2012.  It is now used for intramural and club sports.

Director's Cup
The NACDA Director's Cup is an award given annually by the National Association of Collegiate Directors of Athletics to the colleges and universities with the most success in collegiate athletics.  Points for the NACDA Director's Cup are based on order of finish in various NCAA sponsored championships or based on various polls. The following is Iowa State's finish in the Director's Cup since 1993:

^indicates a current standing
 indicates ranking down from previous year
 indicates ranking up from previous year

Voice of the Cyclones

From the early 1970s until his death on March 5, 2003, Pete Taylor was the "Voice of the Cyclones".  Initially, Pete both worked the ISU events and was the sports director at KCCI TV, formerly KRNT TV.  He provided play by play coverage of Iowa State Cyclones Athletics over the Cyclone network both on the radio and on the television.  In 1990 after he left KCCI, Taylor joined the Iowa State staff full-time.  Following Pete's death, John Walters succeeded Pete as the "Voice of the Cyclones" on June 17, 2003, providing play by play coverage on both the radio and the television.  Initially, John both worked the ISU events and was the sports director at WOI TV.  In June 2012, John left WOI TV and joined the Iowa State staff full-time.

References

External links